Chahtoul-Jouret Mhad (also spelled Shahtoul or Shahtul) is a municipality in the Keserwan District of the Keserwan-Jbeil Governorate, Lebanon. It consists of the villages of Chahtoul and Jouret Mhad. The municipality is located 32 kilometers north of Beirut. Its average elevation is 920 meters above sea level and its total land area is 290 hectares. 

Its inhabitants are predominantly Maronite Catholics. The major families in Chahtoul include Ziadé, Salamé, Oueiss, Obeid, Kallassi, Najem, El-Khoury, Mnessa, Nader, Rizkalla. Members of many of these families (such as Salamé, Oueiss, and Obeid) migrated to the Qartaba area in Ottoman Lebanon during the Peasant's Rebellion of the 1860 civil conflict in Mount Lebanon and Damascus, and the Great Famine of Mount Lebanon.

Chahtoul is the hometown of the Lebanese writer May Ziadeh. A statue of her is situated in the village. Chahtoul is in the Dioceses of Jounieh.

Landmarks
Church of Saint-Joseph (town center)
Saydet el-Kalaa Church and Lady's Holy Cave

References

Populated places in Keserwan District
Maronite Christian communities in Lebanon